Agapanthia orbachi is a species of beetle in the family Cerambycidae. It was described by Sama in 1993.

References

orbachi
Beetles described in 1993